The Utah general elections, 2018 were held in the U.S. state of Utah on November 6, 2018. One of Utah's U.S. Senate seats was up for election, as well as all four seats in the United States House of Representatives, fourteen Utah Senate seats and all of the Utah House of Representatives seats.

United States Senate

Incumbent Senator Orrin Hatch was eligible for re-election, but did not run in 2018. Republican Mitt Romney was elected to the U. S. Senate, defeating Democratic nominee and Salt Lake County Council member Jenny Wilson.

United States House of Representatives

All of Utah's four seats in the United States House of Representatives were up for election in November. In districts 1, 2, and 3, Republican incumbents were re-elected.  In district 4, Salt Lake County Mayor Ben McAdams defeated two-term incumbent Republican Mia Love.

Utah Senate

Fifteen Utah Senate seats were up for election in November.

Utah House of Representatives

All 75 seats in the Utah House of Representatives were up for election in November.

State Board of Education

References

External links
Candidates at Vote Smart 
Candidates at Ballotpedia
Campaign finance at OpenSecrets

 
Utah